A passenger train is a train used to transport people along a railroad line. These trains may consist of unpowered passenger railroad cars (also known as coaches or carriages) hauled by one or more locomotives, or may be self-propelled; self propelled passenger trains are known as multiple units or railcars. Passenger trains stop at stations or depots, where passengers may board and disembark. In most cases, passenger trains operate on a fixed schedule and have priority over freight trains.

Passenger trains may be made up of a number of passenger cars hauled by one or more locomotives, or may be made up of self-propelled railcars.  Car design and the general safety of passenger trains have dramatically evolved over time, making travel by rail remarkably safe.  Some passenger trains, both long-distance and short-distance, use bi-level (double-decker) cars to carry more passengers per train.  Passenger trains hauled by locomotives are more expensive to operate than multiple units, but have a higher passenger capacity.

Many prestigious passenger train services have been bestowed a special name, some of which have become famous in literature and fiction.

History

The first occasion on which a railway locomotive pulled a train carrying passengers was in 1804 at Penydarren Ironworks in Wales, when 70 employees of the ironworks were transported 9 miles by an engine designed by Richard Trevithick. In 1808, Trevithick ran a passenger-carrying exhibition train called Catch Me Who Can on a small loop of track in London. The exhibition, which ran for two weeks, charged passengers for rides. The first passenger train in regular service was a horse drawn train on the Swansea and Mumbles Railway.

The first steam train carrying passengers on a public railway was hauled by Locomotion No. 1 on the Stockton and Darlington Railway in 1825, traveling at speeds up to 15 miles per hour.

Travel by passenger trains in the United States began in the 1830s and became popular in the 1850s and '60s. The first electric passenger train was exhibited at the Berlin Industrial Exposition 1879. The first successful commercial electric passenger train, the Gross-Lichterfelde Tramway, ran a year later in Lichterfelde.

Long-distance trains

Long-distance trains travel between many cities or regions of a country, and sometimes cross several countries. They often have a dining car or restaurant car to allow passengers to have a meal during the course of their journey. Trains travelling overnight may also have sleeping cars.

High-speed rail 

One notable and growing long-distance train category is high-speed rail, which generally runs at speeds above  and often operates on a dedicated track that is surveyed and prepared to accommodate high speeds. The first successful example of a high-speed passenger rail system was Japan's Shinkansen, colloquially known as the "bullet train", which commenced operation in October 1964. Other examples include Italy's LeFrecce, France's TGV (Train à Grande Vitesse, literally "high speed train"), Germany's ICE (Inter-City Express), and Spain's AVE (Alta Velocidad Española).

In most cases, high-speed rail travel is time- and cost-competitive with air travel when distances do not exceed , as airport check-in and boarding procedures can add at least two hours to the overall transit time. Also, rail operating costs over these distances may be lower when the amount of jet fuel consumed by an airliner during takeoff and climbout is taken into consideration. Air travel becomes more cost-competitive as the travel distance increases because the fuel accounts for less of the overall operating cost of the airliner.

Some high-speed rail systems employ tilting technology to improve stability in curves. Examples of tilting trains are the Advanced Passenger Train (APT), the Pendolino, the N700 Series Shinkansen, Amtrak's Acela and the Spanish Talgo. Tilting is a dynamic form of superelevation, allowing both low- and high-speed traffic to use the same trackage (though not simultaneously), as well as producing a more comfortable ride for passengers.

Inter-city trains

"Inter-city" is a general term for any rail service that uses trains with limited stops to provide fast long-distance travel. Inter-city services can be divided into three major groups:

 InterCity: using high-speed trains to connect cities, bypassing all intermediate stations, thus linking major population hubs in the fastest time possible
 Express: calling at some intermediate stations between cities, serving larger urban communities
 Regional: calling at all intermediate stations between cities, serving smaller communities along the route

The distinction between the three types of inter-city rail service may be unclear; trains can run as InterCity services between major cities, then revert to an express (or even regional) train service to reach communities at the furthest points of the journey. This practice allows less populous communities to be served in the most cost-effective way, at the expense of a longer journey time for those wishing to travel to the terminus station.

Higher-speed rail 

Higher-speed rail services operate at top speeds that are higher than conventional inter-city trains but below high-speed rail services. These services are provided after improvements to the conventional rail infrastructure to support trains that can operate safely at higher speeds.

Short-distance trains

Commuter trains 

Many cities and their surrounding areas are served by commuter trains (also known as suburban trains), which serve commuters who live outside of the city they work in, or vice versa. More specifically, in the United States commuter rail service is defined as, "short-haul rail passenger transportation in metropolitan and suburban areas usually having reduced fare, multiple ride, and commuter tickets and morning and evening peak period operations". Trains are very efficient for transporting large numbers of people at once, compared to road transport. While automobiles may be delayed by traffic congestion, trains operate on dedicated rights-of-way which allow them to bypass such congestion.

With the use of bilevel cars, which are tall enough to have two levels of seating, commuter rail services can haul as many as 150 commuters per train car, and over 1,000 per train, significantly outpacing the capacity of automobiles and buses.

Railcar 

In British and Australian usage, a "railcar" is a self-propelled railway vehicle designed to transport passengers. The term is usually used in reference to a train consisting of a single passenger car (carriage, coach) with a driver's cab at one or both ends. Some railways, e.g. the Great Western Railway, used the term "railmotor". If the railcar is able to pull a full train, it is more likely to be called a "motor coach" or a "motor car". The term "railcar" is sometimes also used as an alternative name for the small types of multiple unit that consist of more than one coach.

Rapid transit 

Rapid transit trains are urban-transport rails that operate on exclusive right-of-way in that pedestrians or vehicles may not access it.

Light rail 
Light rails are electrically powered urban passenger trains that run along an exclusive rights-of-way at ground level, raised structures, tunnels, or in streets. Light rail systems generally use lighter equipment that operate at slower speeds to allow for more flexibility in integrating systems into urban environments.

Tram

Trams (also known as streetcars in North America) are a type of passenger train that run alongside public urban streets on a tramway track, often including segments of right-of-way for passengers and vehicles.

Heritage trains 

Heritage trains are operated by volunteers, often railfans, as a tourist attraction or as a museum railway. Usually, the trains are formed from historic vehicles retired from national commercial operation that have retained or assumed the character, appearance, and operating practices of railways in their time. Sometimes lines that operate in isolation also provide transport facilities for their respective community. Much of the equipment used on these train's systems are original or at least aim to replicate both the look and operating practices of historic/former railways companies.

See also 

 Passenger rail terminology
 Passenger train toilet
 Drumhead (sign)
 Headboard (train)
 Luxury trains

References 

Trains